Bez's Madchester Anthems: Sorted Tunes From Back In The Day! is mainly a Madchester compilation album, compiled by Bez (known from the bands Happy Mondays and Black Grape) and released in 2006.

Track listing

Disc one
"Step On" - Happy Mondays
"The Only One I Know" - The Charlatans
"Come Home" - James
"Blue Monday" - New Order
"Sally Cinnamon" - The Stone Roses
"Groovy Train" - The Farm
"Move Any Mountain" - Shamen
"Pacific State" - 808 State
"NRG" - Adamski
"Hello" - The Beloved
"Get The Message" - Electronic
"She's A Rainbow" - World Of Twist
"Perfume" (Loved Up)" - Paris Angels
"Shack Up" - A Certain Ratio
"Shall We Take A Trip" - Northside
"Only Rhyme That Bites" - MC Tunes & 808 State
"Abandon" - That Petrol Emotion
"Shine On" - The House of Love
"There She Goes" - The La's
"Panic" - The Smiths

Disc two
 "She Bangs the Drums" - The Stone Roses
 "Loaded" - Primal Scream
 "Kinky Afro" - Happy Mondays
 "This Is How It Feels" - Inspiral Carpets
 "How Soon Is Now" - The Smiths
 "Can You Dig It" - Mock Turtles
 "Stepping Stone" - The Farm
 "Fine Time" - New Order
 "Hardcore Uproar" - Together
 "Chime" - Orbital
 "Papua New Guinea" - Future Sound of London
 "What Can You Do For Me" - Utah Saints
 "Strawberry Fields Forever" - Candy Flip
 "Never Enough" - The Cure
 "Only Love Can Break Your Heart" - Saint Etienne
 "Voodoo Ray" - A Guy Called Gerald
 "Sun Rising" - The Beloved
 "One Dream" - Bez & Monica Ward

Regional music compilation albums
Madchester
2007 compilation albums